Locust Creek is a stream in Wayne County, Iowa and Chariton, Linn, Livingston, Putnam and Sullivan counties in Missouri. It is a tributary of the Grand River.

It flows south into Putnam County, Missouri, and passes under US Route 136 six miles west of Unionville. It continues into Sullivan County passing three miles west of Pollock. It continues south roughly parallel to and west of Missouri Route 5 past the west side of Milan, through the Locust Creek Conservation Area and passing east of Reger. It enters Linn County just west of Browning. It flows south through Linn County passing the communities of Purdin, Linneus and Laclede. The stream turns to the southwest and enters Pershing State Park. The stream exits Linn County, and forms the boundary between Chariton and Livingston counties, and reaches its confluence with the Grand just west of the community of Sumner. At Linneus, the creek has a mean annual discharge of 351 cubic feet per second.

Locust Creek was named for the black or honey locust timber lining its course.

See also
List of rivers of Iowa
List of rivers of Missouri

References

Rivers of Wayne County, Iowa
Rivers of Chariton County, Missouri
Rivers of Linn County, Missouri
Rivers of Livingston County, Missouri
Rivers of Putnam County, Missouri
Rivers of Sullivan County, Missouri
Rivers of Iowa
Rivers of Missouri